Verkhnyaya Khokhlovka is a rural locality (a village) in Khokhlovskoye Rural Settlement, Permsky District, Perm Krai, Russia. The population was 4 as of 2010. There are 10 streets.

Geography 
Verkhnyaya Khokhlovka is located 49 km north of Perm (the district's administrative centre) by road. Khokhlovka is the nearest rural locality.

References 

Rural localities in Permsky District